Where I Wanna Be is the first album by Cravin' Melon, released in 1995. The album was self-produced.

Track list

References

1995 albums
Cravin' Melon albums